"Oh Yeah", also known as "Oh Yeah (There's a Band Playing On the Radio)" or "Oh Yeah (On the Radio)" on certain releases, is a hit single by the English rock band Roxy Music. It was released as the second single from their 1980 album Flesh and Blood. The song is featured prominently in the fifth episode of the Stephen Merchant comedy series Hello Ladies.

Background
The song was recorded during the sessions for the album "Flesh and Blood", their first album since the departure of drummer Paul Thompson from the band. This turned Roxy Music into a trio consisting of Bryan Ferry, Andy Mackay and Phil Manzanera. Two session musicians filled in for Thompson, with Allan Schwartzberg playing drums on the majority of the album, and Andy Newmark playing on two tracks. 

"Oh Yeah" was backed by the non-LP track "South Downs", a synth instrumental by Ferry, or by the album tracks "Rain Rain Rain" (in the USA) and "In the Midnight Hour" (in Australia and South Africa).

"South Downs" when re-released on the boxset of "The Thrill of It All" was accidentally released backwards, but due to the nature of the synthetic string sound, it didn't sound out of place. The original version reappeared on a 3-track CD single with "Jealous Guy" and "Lover".

Chart Performance 
"Oh Yeah" debuted on the UK Singles Chart at No. 30 and reached a peak of No.5  on August 16th. This was the second top 10 from the album with the  previous single, "Over You", also reaching a peak of No.5, and their fourth consecutive UK top 10. "Oh Yeah" spent a total of 8 weeks on the UK Singles chart, three of which were within the top 10.  

Although released as a single in USA, "Oh Yeah" did not chart on the Billboard Hot 100.

Personnel
 Bryan Ferry – vocals, keyboards
 Phil Manzanera – guitar
 Andy Mackay – saxophones and oboe
 Neil Hubbard – guitar
 Paul Carrack – strings
 Neil Jason – bass
 Allan Schwartzberg – drums

Charts

References

1980 singles
Roxy Music songs
Rock ballads
1980s ballads
Songs written by Bryan Ferry
1980 songs
Atco Records singles
Reprise Records singles
E.G. Records singles
Songs about radio